Lizy-sur-Ourcq (literally Lizy on Ourcq) is a commune in the Seine-et-Marne department in the Île-de-France region in north-central France.

Demographics
Inhabitants are called Lizéens.

Localisation 
Lizy-sur-Ourcq is located at 16 km in the North-East of Meaux and at 60 km in the North-East of Paris.

International relations

Lizy-sur-Ourcq is twinned with:
 Burwell, United Kingdom

Education
Schools include:
 École maternelle Bellevue - Preschool
 École Saint Albert - Preschool and elementary school
 École Henri Des - Lower elementary school
 École Claude Monet - Upper elementary school
 Collège Camille Saint-Saëns - Junior high school

See also
Communes of the Seine-et-Marne department

References

External links

 Official site 
1999 Land Use, from IAURIF (Institute for Urban Planning and Development of the Paris-Île-de-France région) 

Communes of Seine-et-Marne